

The LFG V 20 Arkona (named for Kap Arkona on Rügen) was a seaplane airliner produced in small quantities in Germany in the early 1920s. It was a conventional, strut-braced, low-wing monoplane with an enclosed cabin for four passengers. The undercarriage consisted of twin pontoons. Originally produced in wood, a metal version of the aircraft was also developed

The V 20s were operated by Luft-Fahrzeug on its Hamburg-Stettin-Danzing and Stettin-Swinemünde-Stralsund routes.

Specifications

References

Further reading

 

1920s German airliners
Floatplanes
LFG aircraft
Single-engined tractor aircraft
Low-wing aircraft